Dávid Forgács (born 29 September 1995) is a Hungarian professional footballer who plays for BFC Siófok.

Club career
On 13 July 2021 Forgács signed a contract with Győri ETO for the term of two years with an optional third year.

International career
He was part of the Hungarian U-19 at the 2014 UEFA European Under-19 Championship and  U-20 team at the 2015 FIFA U-20 World Cup.

Club statistics

Updated to games played as of 15 September 2018.

References

External links

1995 births
Sportspeople from Szeged
Living people
Hungarian footballers
Association football defenders
Hungary youth international footballers
Hungary under-21 international footballers
Atalanta B.C. players
Pisa S.C. players
U.S. Ancona 1905 players
Diósgyőri VTK players
Nyíregyháza Spartacus FC players
Paksi FC players
Szentlőrinci SE footballers
Győri ETO FC players
BFC Siófok players
Serie C players
Nemzeti Bajnokság I players
Nemzeti Bajnokság II players
Hungarian expatriate footballers
Expatriate footballers in Italy
Hungarian expatriate sportspeople in Italy